Steven Cornell Cleveland (born February 4, 1952) is a former American college basketball coach. He had been men's head basketball head coach at Fresno City College, BYU, and Fresno State.

Early life and education
Cleveland was born in Los Angeles County and raised in Fresno, California. He attended Herbert Hoover High School in Fresno, then began his college basketball career at Fresno City College before going on a mission for the Church of Jesus Christ of Latter-day Saints to England from 1971 to 1973. Cleveland returned to Fresno City College in the 1973–74 season, after which he was named the team's Most Outstanding Player and transferred to UC Irvine. At UC Irvine, Cleveland played at forward. He averaged 8.8 points and 4.8 rebounds as a junior in 1974–75 and 15.0 points and 5.5 rebounds as a senior in 1975–76. Cleveland graduated from UC Irvine with a bachelor's degree in social science in 1976 and later completed a master's in education administration from Fresno Pacific University in 1979.

Coaching career

High school and junior college
From 1980 to 1990, Cleveland was varsity boys' basketball head coach at Clovis West High School and went 180–70 in those ten seasons. At Clovis West, Cleveland also taught U.S. government and economics. Cleveland returned to Fresno City College to be men's basketball head coach. From 1990 to 1997, Cleveland went 157–77 with a Central Valley Conference championship in 1997 and CCCAA Tournament appearances every year. Among players he coached at Fresno City were Rafer Alston, who would go on to play in the NBA.

BYU
Cleveland moved up to the major college level in 1997 as head coach at BYU. He inherited a team that had just suffered a 1–25 season, the worst in school history. 

In his first season, BYU finished 9–21 in 1997–98. BYU improved to 22–11 in 1999–2000, BYU's first season in the Mountain West Conference (MW) and made the NIT quarterfinals. The following season, BYU won the MW Tournament after splitting the regular season title and made the NCAA tournament. BYU then made the 2002 NIT and NCAA Tournaments of 2003 and 2004 and again was MW co-champion in 2003. The MW also awarded Cleveland with Coach of the Year honors in 2003. BYU fell to 9–21 in 2004–05, Cleveland's final season.

Fresno State
On April 9, 2005, Fresno State hired Cleveland as men's basketball head coach. Cleveland's hiring followed the resignation of previous head coach Ray Lopes. In 2006, due to recruiting violations under Lopes's watch, the NCAA issued a show-cause penalty to Lopes and placed Fresno State men's basketball on five years of probation. Also, Cleveland inherited a program whose Academic Progress Rate (APR) was 611, the worst in the nation.

Cleveland went 92–98 in six seasons at Fresno State. In his first two seasons, Fresno State finished 8–8 and 10–6 in Western Athletic Conference (WAC) play, and Fresno State's only postseason appearance in his tenure was in the NIT. The 2006–07 team also featured Dominic McGuire, a transfer from Cal who became a second-round 2007 NBA draft pick. The team APR also improved to 928 by the end of his tenure.

Post-coaching career
On March 17, 2011, Cleveland stepped down from coaching to assume an administrative post in the Fresno State athletic department. Later that year, Cleveland took a position as an analyst for BYUtv Sports.

In 2013, he began a three-year term as a mission president for the Church of Jesus Christ of Latter-day Saints in the Indiana Indianapolis Mission.

Head coaching record

Junior college
Source:

College

References

1952 births
Living people
Basketball coaches from California
Latter Day Saints from California
American men's basketball players
BYU Cougars men's basketball announcers
BYU Cougars men's basketball coaches
College men's basketball head coaches in the United States
Fresno City Rams men's basketball players
Fresno Pacific University alumni
Fresno State Bulldogs men's basketball coaches
Junior college men's basketball coaches in the United States
Mission presidents (LDS Church)
Place of birth missing (living people)
UC Irvine Anteaters men's basketball players
Sportspeople from Fresno, California
Basketball players from California
High school basketball coaches in California
American Mormon missionaries in England
Forwards (basketball)